Escravos GTL is a gas to liquids (GTL) project based in Escravos region, Nigeria. The plant converts natural gas into liquid petroleum products.

History
A pre-feasibility study of Escravos GTL was conducted in April 1998, followed by an engineering feasibility study.  The Front-End Engineering and Design (FEED) was completed in 2002.  At the same year, agreements between Sasol, Chevron Corporation and Nigerian National Petroleum Company were signed.  The construction contract was awarded in April 2005 to a consortium of JGC, KBR and Snamprogetti.

Description
The GTL plant cost US$10 billion and started up in summer 2014; its original cost started out at US$1.9 billion in 2005,  rising to US$5.9 billion in 2009 but continued to escalate. The plant uses the Fischer–Tropsch process technology and Chevron's ISOCRACKING technology.

Partners
The project was developed by Chevron Nigeria Limited (75%) and the Nigerian National Petroleum Company (15%).  Sasol gained interest in the project early on, acquiring half of Chevron Nigeria's stake; however, due to increased cost and delays, Sasol reduced its stake to 10% in late 2008.

References

Natural gas plants
Petroleum production
Energy infrastructure in Nigeria
Petroleum industry in Nigeria
Natural gas in Nigeria
Chevron Corporation
Synthetic fuel facilities